Epicurean was a compilation of early work by The Orchids, released by Sarah Records in 1992.

Track listing
"Peaches"
"A place called Home"  
"Tiny Words"  
"Moon Lullaby"  
"Walter"  
"It's Only Obvious"  
"Long Drawn Sunday Night"  
"Blue Light"  
"Yawn" 
"Sigh" 
"Something For The Longing" 
"The York Song"  
"Bemused, Confused and Bedraggled" 
"Caveman" 
"Underneath The Window, Underneath The Sink"
"Pelican Blonde" 
"Women Priests And Addicts" 
"Carrole-Anne"
"Tropical Fishbowl"
"The Sadness Of Sex (Part 1)"

Sarah Records albums
The Orchids albums
1991 compilation albums